Rocky Roberts (born Charles Roberts, Tanner, August 23, 1940 – Rome, January 13, 2005) was an American-born Italian rhythm and blues singer.

Born in Alabama, Roberts served in the United States Navy and was a Navy champion boxer. He first got interested in singing after listening to a country-oriented musician named Doug Fowlkes, whose band the Airdales (US-navy slang for Navy pilots) used to perform on the ship where Roberts was stationed. Fowlkes, impressed by Roberts' voice, eventually agreed to let him sit in with the band.

Roberts won a singing competition while on shore leave in Juan-les-Pins, France, and chose to stay in Europe after retiring from the Navy in 1962.

Roberts had a stint in France
performing at ORTF television
show Les raisins verts, and achieved some success with an early version of "T-Bird" and "Monkiss".

In 1965 Renzo Arbore and Gianni Boncompagni invited Roberts to Rome to record the theme of their Radio Show, Bandiera Gialla. The song, "T-Bird", was a hit in the Italian charts and Roberts settled in Rome.

In 1967, Roberts had a major Italian hit, "Stasera Mi Butto", which sold 3.7 million copies and won the Festivalbar. The song's success led to a 1967 motion picture of the same title, starring Roberts. He appeared subsequently in several other Italian films.

He was known for always wearing dark sunglasses.

Roberts sang the Luis Bacalov-written theme song from the 1966 film, Django. Quentin Tarantino reused the recording as the opening theme for his 2012 film Django Unchained.

He died of lung cancer in Rome in 2005 at the age of 64.

Filmography

References

External links
 .

1941 births
2005 deaths
People from Limestone County, Alabama
20th-century African-American male singers
American expatriates in Italy
American expatriate musicians
American emigrants to Italy
20th-century American male singers
20th-century American singers
20th-century Italian male singers
Deaths from lung cancer in Lazio
21st-century African-American people